Nyuk
LNyuk

Lake Nyuk(Karelian: Nyukozero) is a large freshwater lake in the Republic of Karelia, northwestern part of Russia. There are numerous islands on the lake. The lake is part of the Kem River basin.

General information 
The surface area is 214 km², the catchment area is 3090 km².

It has a blade shape. The coast is high and rocky. Food snow and rain. The level fluctuation range is 70 cm. It is covered with ice from the end of October to the end of April. 

There are 126 islands on the lake with a total area of ​​about 10.3 km². The largest islands: Thorayssari (1.13 km²), Vezansari, Kurchunsari, Papinsari, Keurunsari, Hernesari.

The average amplitude of the level fluctuation is 0.9 m.

The name Nyuk is translated from Karelian as Swan.

Water Sources 
12 rivers flow into the lake. The largest ones are: Nogeusjoki(ru), Kangashoya(ru) and Vaivaoya(ru). The Rastas(ru)and Khyame(ru)rivers flow out (tributaries of the Chirko-Kem river(ru), Kem river basin ).

Lakes 
The Nyuk basin also includes lakes:

 Uimusejärvi(ru)
 Elmisyarvi(ru)
 Mushtalaksi(ru)
 Kormusjärvi(ru)

A large area of the bottom is occupied by silty soils. In the bays, the higher aquatic vegetation is represented by reeds, horsetails, pondweeds.

Vendace, whitefish, pike, perch, roach, bream, burbot, and ruff live in the lake.

See Also 

 Lakes of Karelia(ru)
 Republic of Karelia